Callocladia is an extinct genus of prehistoric bryozoans in the extinct family Crustoporidae.

See also 
 List of prehistoric bryozoan genera

References

External links 

 
 
 Callocladia at bryozone.myspecies.info

Trepostomata
Prehistoric bryozoan genera
Stenolaemata genera
Extinct bryozoans